South Korea competed at the 1992 Summer Paralympics in Barcelona, Spain. 66 competitors from South Korea won 44 medals, 11 gold, 15 silver and 18 bronze and finished 12th in the medal table.

See also 
 South Korea at the Paralympics
 South Korea at the 1992 Summer Olympics

References 

South Korea at the Paralympics
1992 in South Korean sport
Nations at the 1992 Summer Paralympics